Antonio Robinson (born on November 11, 1985) is a former American football wide receiver. He was signed by the Chicago Bears as an undrafted free agent in 2010. He later won Super Bowl XLV as a member of the Green Bay Packers, defeating the Pittsburgh Steelers. He played college football for Nicholls State University. He most recently was a member of the Winnipeg Blue Bombers of the Canadian Football League but was cut April 17, 2014 during Training Camp.

Professional career

Green Bay Packers
For the 2010 and 2011 seasons, Robinson was a member of the Green Bay Packers in the NFL.

Seattle Seahawks
Robinson was signed to the Seattle Seahawks' practice squad on November 9, 2010, and was released on November 23.

Omaha Nighthawks
In 2012, Robinson played for the Omaha Nighthawks in the United Football League.

New Orleans VooDoo
Robinson was assigned to the New Orleans VooDoo of the Arena Football League on June 5, 2013.

External links
Nicholls State bio
NFL bio

References

Nicholls State Colonels football

1985 births
Living people
People from Winnfield, Louisiana
Players of American football from Miami
American football wide receivers
Nicholls Colonels football players
Chicago Bears players
Omaha Nighthawks players
New Orleans VooDoo players
Orlando Predators players
Green Bay Packers players
Seattle Seahawks players
Players of Canadian football from Miami